Striadorbis pedderi is a species of minute freshwater snail with an operculum, aquatic gastropod mollusc or micromollusc in the family Glacidorbidae. This species is endemic to Australia.

This species was previously placed in the Hydrobiidae.

References

Glacidorbidae
Gastropods described in 1973
Taxonomy articles created by Polbot
Taxobox binomials not recognized by IUCN